Higino "Inong" Anoya Acala Sr. (January 11, 1925 – September 20, 1968) was a Filipino lawyer and civil servant. He was one of the key persons and important characters in the creation of "Bugho for Municipal Movement" during the mid-1950s. Upon the conversion of Bugho as independent town, thru the influence of Speaker Daniel Z. Romualdez he was installed as the first Municipal election Officer of then Bugho town, and served later as Municipal registrar.

Early life
Acala was born in Brgy. Calbasag in Julita, Leyte and was the seventh of the eleven siblings of six girls and seven boys. He finished his preliminary education in Arellano University where he earned later his law degree at the Arellano University School of Law, and was admitted to the bar on March 12, 1957. Acala studied his pre-law education at the University of the East in Sampaloc, Manila, Philippines to obtain a Bachelor of Arts degree.  He married a native of Bugho named Beatrize A. Maballo with whom he had the following children: Evelyn, Higino Jr., and Brenilyn.

Notes

References
 
 sc.judiciary.gov.ph/bar/law%20list/Ax.htm
 www.lawphil.net/courts/judattys.html/Ax.htm

External links
 Acala' One Community
 Javieranon Global Network
 An Bag-o nga Julitanhon Association, Inc
 Julita, Leyte (blog)
 (A)

1925 births
1968 deaths
People from Leyte (province)
Arellano University alumni
University of the East alumni
20th-century Filipino lawyers
Filipino civil servants